John Finlay (16 February 1919 – 5 March 1985) was an English professional footballer who played as an inside forward for Sunderland and Grimsby Town FC. John Finlay made his debut for Sunderland on the 11th of September 1946 as a substitute for Sunderland AFC on their 4th match of the season in Division 1 against Charlton Athletic. 27,425 attended the match which started at 6:00pm at Charlton Athletic's stadium “The Valley” was refereed by W.H.E Evans. John Finlay retired from professional football in November 1946

References

1919 births
1985 deaths
People from Birtley, Tyne and Wear
Footballers from Tyne and Wear
English footballers
Association football inside forwards
Sunderland A.F.C. players
English Football League players